Adam Jakobsson (born 7 September 2002), better known as Adaam (stylised in all caps), is a Swedish rapper. At the age of five, he moved to Valsta, Märsta, and grew up on the same estate as fellow rapper VC Barre; the two founded the record label and hip hop collective Grind Gang Music along with D50. Adaam started writing songs at the age of twelve and released his first single, "Trapstar", at fifteen. He is also known for his collaborations with fellow rapper Einár; their single "Dansa" reached the top of the Swedish singles chart upon Einár's death on 21 October 2021.

Discography

Studio albums

EPs

Singles

Featured singles

Other charting songs

Notes

References 

21st-century Swedish male musicians
2002 births
Living people
People from Sigtuna Municipality
Swedish rappers